Indigenous peoples of Colombia, are the ethnic groups who have inhabited Colombia since before the European colonization, in the early 16th century. According to the last census, they comprise 4.4% of the country's population, belonging to 115 different tribes.

Approximately two thirds of the Indigenous peoples of Colombia live in La Guajira, Cauca, Nariño, Cordoba and Sucre Departments. Amazon Basin, a sparsely populated region, is home to over 70 different Indigenous ethnic groups.

History 
Some theories claim the earliest human habitation of South America to be as early as 43,000 BC, but the current scholarly consensus among archaeologists is that human habitation in South America only dates back to around 15,000 BC at the earliest. Anthropologist Tom Dillehay dates the earliest hunter-gatherer cultures on the continent at almost 10,000 BC, during the late Pleistocene and early Holocene periods. According to his evidence based on rock shelters, Colombia's first human inhabitants were probably concentrated along the Caribbean coast and on the Andean highland slopes. By that time, these regions were forested and had a climate resembling today's. Dillehay has noted that Tibitó, located just north of Bogotá, is one of the oldest known and most widely accepted sites of early human occupation in Colombia, dating from about 9,790 BC. There is evidence that the highlands of Colombia were occupied by significant numbers of human foragers by 9,000 BC, with permanent village settlement in northern Colombia by 2,000 BC.

Beginning in the 1st millennium BC, groups of Amerindians including the Muisca, Quimbaya, Tairona, Calima, Zenú, Tierradentro, San Agustín, Tolima, and Urabá became skilled in farming, mining, and metalcraft; and some developed the political system of cacicazgos with a pyramidal structure of power headed by caciques.

Colombia's Indigenous culture evolved from three main groups—the Quimbaya, who inhabited the western slopes of the Cordillera Central; the Chibchas; and the Kalina (Caribs). When the Spanish arrived in 1509, they found a flourishing and heterogeneous Amerindian population that numbered between 1.5 million and 2 million, belonged to several hundred tribes, and largely spoke mutually unintelligible dialects. The two most advanced cultures of Amerindian peoples at the time were the Muisca and Taironas, who belonged to the Chibcha group and were skilled in farming, mining, and metalcraft. The Muisca lived mainly in the present departments of Cundinamarca and Boyacá, where they had fled centuries earlier after raids by the warlike Caribs, some of whom eventually migrated to Caribbean islands near the end of the first millennium A.D. The Taironas, who were divided into two subgroups, lived in the Caribbean lowlands and the highlands of the Sierra Nevada de Santa Marta. The Muisca civilization was well organized into distinct provinces governed by communal land laws and powerful caciques, who reported to one of the two supreme leaders.

Pre-Columbian history  

The complexity of the Indigenous peoples' social organization and technology varied tremendously, from stratified agricultural chiefdoms to tropical farm villages and nomadic hunting and food-gathering groups. At the end of the colonial period, the native population still constituted about half of the total population. In the agricultural chiefdoms of the highlands, the Spaniards successfully imposed institutions designed to ensure their control of the Amerindians and thereby the use of their labor. The colonists had organized political and religious administration by the end of the sixteenth century, and they had begun attempts to religiously convert the Amerindians to Christianity, specifically Roman Catholicism.

The most important institution that regulated the lives and welfare of the highland Amerindians was the resguardo, a reservation system of communal landholdings. Under this system, Amerindians were allowed to use the land but could not sell it. Similar in some respects to the Native American reservation system of the United States, the resguardo has lasted with some changes even to the present and has been an enduring link between the government and the remaining highland tribes. As land pressures increased, however, encroachment of white or mestizo settlers onto resguardo lands accelerated, often without opposition from the government.

The government generally had not attempted to legislate in the past in matters affecting the forest Amerindians. During the colonial period, Roman Catholic missions were granted jurisdiction over the lowland tribes. With the financial support of the government, a series of agreements with the Holy See from 1887 to 1953 entrusted the evangelization and education of these Amerindians to the missions, which worked together with government agencies. Division of the resguardos stopped in 1958, and a new program of community development began to try to bring the Amerindians more fully into the national society.

The struggle of the Indigenous people on these lands to protect their holdings from neighboring landlords and to preserve their traditions continued into the late 20th century, when the 1991 constitution incorporated many of the Amerindian demands. New resguardos have been created, and others have been reconstituted, among forest tribes as well as highland communities. The 1991 constitution opened special political and social arenas for Indigenous and other minority groups. For example, it allowed for creation of a special commission to design a law recognizing the black communities occupying unsettled lands in the riverine areas of the Pacific Coast. Article 171 provides special Senate representation for Amerindians and other ethnic groups, while Article 176 provides special representation in the Chamber of Representatives: two seats "for the black communities, one for Indian communities, one for political minorities, and one for Colombians residing abroad". Article 356 guarantees Amerindian territorial and cultural rights, and several laws and decrees have been enacted protecting them. Article 356 refers somewhat vaguely to both "Indigenous territorial entities" and Indigenous resguardos.

By 1991 the country's 587 resguardos contained 800,271 people, including 60,503 families. The general regional distribution of these resguardos was as follows: Amazonia, 88; llanos, 106; Caribbean lowlands, 31; Andean highlands, 104; and Pacific lowlands, 258. They totaled , or about 24 percent of the national territory. Colombia today may have as many as 710 resguardos in 27 of the 32 departments.

Indigenous political organization
Individual Indigenous groups have a variety of governance structures. A number of Indigenous groups are represented through the National Indigenous Organization of Colombia (ONIC - Organización Nacional Indígena de Colombia). Increasing organization and agitation have sharply broadened the Indigenous land base over the past forty years. The government titled more than 200 new reserves from 1960 to 1990, with 334 total operating as autonomous municipalities by 1997.

Territories

Indigenous peoples hold title to substantial portions of Colombia, primarily in the form of Indigenous Reserves, which encompass one-third of the country's land. The Indigenous Affairs division of the Ministry of Interior has 567 reserves on record, covering approximately 365,004 km² which are home to 800,272 persons in 67,503 families.

The 1991 National Constitution of Colombia defined Territorial Entities (Entidades Territoriales) as departments, districts, municipalities and Indigenous territories.
Within an Indigenous Territory Entity (ETI) the people have autonomy in managing their interests, and within the limits of the constitution have the right to manage resources and define taxes required to perform their duties. ETIs are to be defined by the government in conformance with the Organic Law on Land Management.
However, this law has yet to be sanctioned so in practice the territories are unregulated.

Major ethnic groups
According to the National Indigenous Organization of Colombia (ONIC), there are 102 Indigenous groups in Colombia. The ethnic groups with the greatest number of members are the Wayuu (380,460), Zenú, (307,091), Nasa (243,176) and Pastos (163,873). These peoples account for 58.1% of Colombia's Indigenous population.

Highland peoples refer to the cultures of the Andes and the Sierra Nevada de Santa Marta of Colombia, while lowland peoples refer to the inhabitants of Chocó, Amazonia, Guajira and the Caribbean Coast, the Urabá Region and other non-mountain cultures.

Highland peoples

 Arhuacos/Ijka
 Awá
 Coconuco
 Guambiano/Misak
 Guane
 Inga
 Kamsá (Sibundoy)
 Kankuamo
 Kogui/Kággaba
 Muisca
 Páez/Nasa
 Pacabuy
 Pasto
 Panche
 Pijao
 Sutagao
 Tama 
 Totoró
 Umbrá
 U'wa/Tunebo
 Wiwa/Sanhá
 Yanacona
 Quimbaya

Lowland peoples

 Achagua
 Amorúa
 Andaquí
 Andoque
 Bara
 Barasana
 Barí/Motilon
 Betoye
 Bora
 Cabiyarí
 Carapana
 Carijona
 Catío
 Cocama/Kokama
 Cofán/Kofán
 Coreguaje
 Cubeo
 Cuiba
 Curripaco
 Chimila
 Chiricoa
 Desano
 Emberá
 Guahibo (Sikuani)
 Guayabero
 Guayupe
 Kuna (Tule)
 Kokama
 Hupda
 Letuama
 Makaguaje
 Makuna
 Masiguare
 Mvatapí
 Miraña
 Mokaná
 Muinane
 Muzo
 Nonuya
 Nukak
 Ocaína
 Piapoco
 Piaroa
 Piratapuyo
 Pitsamira
 Puinave
 Sáliba
 Siona
 Siriano
 Taiwano
 Tanimuka
 Tariano
 Tatuyo
 Tikuna
 Tukano
 Tuyuca
 Wounaan
 Wanano
 Wayuú
 Witoto/Huitoto/Uitoto
 Yagua
 Yarigui
 Yukuna
 Yukpa/Yuko
 Yuri
 Yurutí
 Zenú

Struggle for rights

The Indigenous people represent 2-3% of the population of the Colombian region and its levels of income as well as the indicators of human development as education and health conditions are laying behind compared to those of the rest of the Colombians. During the last twenty years, there has been a remarkable increase of the interest dedicated to the concerns of Indigenous communities all over the world. Therefore, the United Nations proclaimed the disclosure of the International Decade of the World's Indigenous People and in Latin America on 10 December 1994 and in Latin America. More than in any other region, this period was characterized by a wave of Indigenous movements which practised a growing political power, since the resistance of the Chiapas of 1994 until the fall of the governments of Ecuador and Bolivia.

The rise of Indigenous mobilization in Colombia is explained as a reaction of crisis at various levels: a crisis of representation, caused by the shortcomings of political parties with sufficient representation to shoulder all collectives' interests; a crisis of participation, that is the result of the lack of citizen's participation in state's business; and a legitimation crisis, due to the discrimination against some social groups.

During their struggle for rights, Indigenes abandoned the armed struggle of the 1980s and the new strategy included forms of legal liberalism, a politics of identity and the use of transnational networks putting pressure on the state to achieve recognition and respect. This hasn't always led to success and often turned into victims of the cultural project of neoliberalism. Besides the cultural accomplishments there was an escalation of the acts of persecution and in the number of violations committed against them.

According to the Indigenous National Organization of Colombia (ONIC) there are 102 Indigenous peoples in Colombia and only 82 of them are recognized by the Colombian government. One of the main problems the Colombian Indigenous communities are currently facing is the lack of recognition of their right to be consulted. Poverty is another central aspect in order to understand the contemporary situation of the Indigenes of Colombia, which has been measured making use of the Unsatisfied Basic Needs (UBN), considering people poor who have insufficiencies in living, services and education. Facts show differences between zones: those of greater influence of poverty measured with the UBN standard are Chocó, Sucre, Boyacá, Nariño and Córdoba, with numbers that exceed the 50% of the population and those of less influence are found in Bogotá and the departments of El Valle, Atlántico and the cafetero-core: Caldas, Quindío and Risaralda.
In 1986 the concept of pobreza absoluta was introduced in the nation, during a situation of crisis of governability and the escalation of the problems concerning the armed conflict. With the politics of struggle against poverty the presence of the state was tried to be consolidated in zones which were considered 'marginal', especially those areas including Indigenous population.

Politics between 1986 and 1990 tried to rehabilitate the marginal zones and their integration to achieve development; specific institutions were set up to work with Indigenous communities, seeing them as farmer communities which habits and forms of production had to be modernized. As a consequence, the Indigenous minorities revolted, arguing that it was not up to them to reintegrate but it was the state that had to reform his ideas and recognize them as the original Colombian population. 
The goal was to solve the crisis of governability by eliminating poverty, without excluding local necessities and impulse development from out of the perspective of diversity. The Indigenous communities were considered to be marginal sectors in disadvantage, a highly retarded population which had to be incorporated and integrated in greater society. The Indigenous people were not seen as a part of the diversity of the nation which participation was needed for the construction of it. This conception has survived since the colonization of the continent until now: generally, the Indigenous and also the black diversity is still seen as a negative element which has to be reduced or completely wiped out to guarantee the development and the modernization of Latin American societies.

Despite the Constitution of 1991 with the introduction of the multi-ethnic and multicultural character of the Colombian nation, the contemporary relation between the state and the Indigenous communities seems to be contradictory, particularly because of the presence of the demands of autonomy of the latter. Until today the Colombian government has recognized the Indigenous groups only as communities, meaning that they are considered to be culturally diverse and therefore require a different political treatment to be able to integrate them in national society. Different forms of participation have been assigned to the communities, but always in conformity with legal and constitutional regulations of the state, defined and established throughout history. Though the 1990s were a decade of mobilization and in some way a victory in terms of neoliberal multiculturalism, after twenty years of the Constitution of 1991 people have realized the need of turning to other forms of mobilization, more than legal mobilization. It has been shown that the recognition of equality is not enough; Indigenous peoples have also demanded their right to difference, that is, access to particular rights as Indigenous communities.

Currently, Indigenous political participation, both in national and local elections, remains low, because of various reasons: the fragmentation of the movement due to the several groups within the Colombian Indigenous communities; the loss of the vote from non-Indigenous leaders and the low number of voters due to the fact that they comprise a small part of the national population and most of them live in the countryside without possibilities to vote.

See also

 Pre-Columbian cultures of Colombia
 Spanish conquest of the Muisca
 Spanish conquest of the Chibchan Nations
 Indigenous peoples of South America
 National Indigenous Organization of Colombia (ONIC)
 Colombian mythology
 Colombian folklore
 Archaeological sites in Colombia
 Race and ethnicity in Colombia
 Mestizo Colombians
 Concordat of 1928 (mostly deals with Missionary activities among Indigenous peoples)

Bibliography
 Ideologia mesianico del mundo andino, Juan M. Ossio Acuña, Edicion de Ignacio Prado Pastor

References

13. http://juankbusaenz.blogspot.com/2011/

External links

 UNESCO report on education of indigenous peoples in Colombia
  Ethnic groups of Colombia
 Documentary about the Wayuu Indigenous people of Colombia
 Wayuu women

 
Colombia
Ethnic groups in Colombia
Colombia
Colombia